Zapolzhani is a village in the municipality of Dolneni, North Macedonia.

Demographics
According to the 1467-68 Ottoman defter, Zapolžani appears being largely inhabited by an Albanian population. The register displayed mixed Albanian and Slavic anthroponymy, with instances of individuals bearing both Slavic and Albanian names. The names are Miladin Gjin-ço, Dimitri Preno (Prenk), Gjergji son of Lazar, Gjin son of Meënko, Dimitri son of Galan (Kalan), Buzaka Ivan-i, Gjon Arbanas (t. Arnaut).

According to the 2021 census, the village had a total of 229 inhabitants. Ethnic groups in the village include:
Macedonians 218
Albanians
Persons for whom data are taken from administrative sources 10

References

Villages in Dolneni Municipality